Skourochori is a village and a community in the municipality of Pyrgos, Elis, Greece. In 2011, it had a population of 610 for the village, and 782 for the community (including the village Kato Kavouri). It is situated near the Ionian Sea, at the foot of a low hill. It is 3 km south of Myrtia, 3 km east of Leventochori, 5 km northeast of Katakolo and 8 km west of Pyrgos town centre.

Population

People

Spyros Skouras
Charles Skouras
George Skouras

See also

List of settlements in Elis

External links
Skourochori at the GTP Travel Pages

References

Pyrgos, Elis
Populated places in Elis